The following Confederate States Army regiments and commanders fought in the Battle of Boydton Plank Road on October 27 to 28, 1864. The Union order of battle is listed separately.

Abbreviations used

Military rank
 Gen = General
 LTG = Lieutenant General
 MG = Major General
 BG = Brigadier General
 Col = Colonel
 Ltc = Lieutenant Colonel
 Maj = Major

Other
 (w) = wounded
 (mw) = mortally wounded
 (k) = killed in action
 (c) = captured

Third Corps

MG Henry Heth

Cavalry Corps

LTG Wade Hampton

Notes

Sources
 Katcher, Philip. The Army of Robert E. Lee. London, United Kingdom: Arms and Armour Press, 1994. .
 Trudeau, Noah Andre. The Last Citadel: Petersburg, Virginia June 1864–April 1865. Boston, Massachusetts: Little, Brown and Company, 1991. .

American Civil War orders of battle